Meiolaniidae is an extinct family of large, probably herbivorous stem-group turtles with heavily armored heads and tails known from South America and Australasia. Though once believed to be cryptodires, they are not closely related to any living species of turtle, and lie outside crown group Testudines, having diverged from them around the Middle Jurassic. They are best known from the last surviving genus, Meiolania, which lived in the rain forests of Australia from the Miocene until the Pleistocene, and insular species that lived on Lord Howe Island and New Caledonia during the Pleistocene and possibly the Holocene for the latter. Meiolaniids are part of the broader grouping of Meiolaniformes, which contains more primitive turtles species lacking the distinctive morphology of meiolaniids, known from the Early Cretaceous-Paleocene of South America and Australia.

A similar form is also known from the Miocene Saint Bathans fauna of New Zealand.

The family was once thought to have originated in Australia sometime in the Miocene, when the earliest Meiolania first appeared. However, due to the discovery of South American meiolaniids, including Niolamia in Eocene Argentina, it is now believed that the meiolaniids appeared sometime prior to the breakup of South America, Australia and Antarctica during the Eocene.

More recently, Eocene Australian remains have also been uncovered.

Genera

References 

Meiolaniformes
Cretaceous turtles
Eocene turtles
Miocene turtles
Oligocene turtles
Pleistocene turtles
Pliocene turtles
Taxa named by Richard Lydekker
Extinct turtles